Podgora is a settlement in the Municipality of Šmartno ob Paki in northern Slovenia. It lies on the right bank of the Paka River at its confluence with the Savinja at the foot of Mount Oljka south of Šmartno. The area is part of the traditional region of Styria. The municipality is now included in the Savinja Statistical Region.

References

External links
Podgora at Geopedia

Populated places in the Municipality of Šmartno ob Paki